Jamshedpur Assembly constituency   was one of the assembly constituencies which made up Jamshedpur Lok Sabha seat in  the Indian state of Bihar, (now in Jharkhand).

Members of Assembly 

This constituency was split as East and West segments from 1967 onwards. So, for Elections after 1962, please see Jamshedpur East Assembly constituency and Jamshedpur West Assembly constituency

See also
 Jamshedpur East Assembly constituency
 Jamshedpur West Assembly constituency
 List of states of India by type of legislature
 Vidhan Sabha

References

 Schedule – XIII of Constituencies Order, 2008 of Delimitation of Parliamentary and Assembly constituencies Order, 2008 of the Election Commission of India 

Politics of Jharkhand
Jamshedpur
Former assembly constituencies of Bihar
Communist Party of India politicians from Jharkhand